Barry Robert Bickmore is a professor in the department of geological sciences at Brigham Young University (BYU).  He is also a devout Mormon, having written Restoring the Ancient Church: Joseph Smith and Early Christianity (Ben Lomond: FAIR, 1999) as well as several articles that have been published in the FARMS Review.

Bickmore was born in Redwood City, California, and raised in California and Utah.  He served as a missionary for the Church of Jesus Christ of Latter-day Saints (LDS Church) in Iowa.  He obtained a degree in geology with minors in philosophy and chemistry from BYU.  He then received a Ph.D. in geochemistry from Virginia Polytechnic Institute and State University, where his advisor was Michael F. Hochella.  He then was a postdoctoral research assistant at the University of Colorado for about a year and a half prior to joining the BYU faculty in August 2001.

Bickmore, a conservative Republican, is known for his activism in support of action to combat global warming, such as when he criticized a proposed bill in Utah that described climate change as a hoax. The bill passed in spite of Bickmore's efforts to defeat it.

Among other callings in the LDS Church, Bickmore has served as a seminary teacher.

In geochemistry and related fields, Bickmore has focused on the study of low-temperature geochemical reactions and the development of geoscience curricula as part of the curriculum of elementary education majors.

References

External links
Bickmore's blog, Anti-Climate Change Extremism in Utah
Maxwell Institute bio
BYU faculty bio
Mineralogical study with Bickmore as the lead author

American Latter Day Saint writers
American Mormon missionaries in the United States
20th-century Mormon missionaries
Living people
Brigham Young University alumni
Virginia Tech alumni
Church Educational System instructors
Brigham Young University faculty
American geochemists
Mormon apologists
Latter Day Saints from California
Latter Day Saints from Virginia
Latter Day Saints from Colorado
Latter Day Saints from Utah
Year of birth missing (living people)
Utah Republicans